Project Runway Australia was picked up for a second season by the Arena channel. The season premiered on 8 July 2009. The season concluded on 15 September 2009, with Anthony Capon being announced the winner of the second season of Project Runway.

The prizes for the winner of the second season of Project Runway Australia included a 2009 Holden Cruze, a $100,000 AUD opportunity to showcase their collection at the Rosemount Australia Fashion Week and having their clothes displayed on a six-page spread in Madison magazine.

Contestants

Models
Ruby Hunter-Finale for Anthony Capon
Silvana Lovin
Naomi Kisiedu
Dythea Marais
Natasha Wilson
Odna Gerel
Yasmine Staub
Georgia Sinclair
Sarah Lawrence
Jessica Farrell
Shirlene Lai
Iskra Galic
Annaleise Smith

Challenges

 The designer won the competition
 The designer won the challenge
 The designer is eliminated
 The designer had a high score for the challenge
 The designer was in the top two, or the first to be announced as a high scoring designer
 The designer had a low score for the challenge
 The designer was in the bottom two
 The designer was brought back into the competition

:  Ivana was paired with the winning designer, Anthony, and brought back into the competition.

Episode Challenges
 Episode 1 Challenge: Glamorous Dresses on the Red Carpet
 Episode 2 Challenge: Sexy sleepwear for Peter Alexander's summer collection
 Episode 3 Challenge: Avant Garde garments made from equipment purchased at a hardware store
 Episode 4 Challenge: Three outfits inspired by a zoo animal
 Episode 5 Challenge: A modern cutting edge outfit with at least 3 pieces (menswear) 
 Episode 6 Challenge: Outfit and head piece for Spring Carnival
 Episode 7 Challenge: An innovative outfit using the fresh food and packaging in the market
 Episode 8 Challenge: Three ready-to-wear outfits for summer 2010
 Episode 9 Challenge: A show-stopping dress for the latest collection of leading label J'Aton
 Episodes 10 & 11 Challenge: The final three designers created a 12-look collection for a runway show which determined the Season Two Winner

Judges
 Kristy Hinze
 Jayson Brunsdon
 Sarah Gale

Other Cast Members
 Henry Roth

Episode Summary

Episode One
Original Airdate: 8 July 2009

The premiere episode of Project Runway Australia Season 2 kicked off with the twelve designers introducing themselves. After being introduced to Kristy and Henry, the designers were told that their first challenge would involve using fabrics disguised as furnishings and decorations surrounded them to create a red carpet look. The designers had approximately ten hours total to complete their look. They were also introduced to 12 new models. After being introduced, the models then chose which designer they wanted to model for. The guest judge for this episode was Nicola Finetti, an Australian fashion designer.

 Guest Judge: Nicola Finetti
 Winner: Mark Neighbour
 Eliminated: Jason Chetcuti

Episode Two
Original Airdate: 15 July 2009

This episode's challenge is to create at least two pieces of sexy sleepwear for Pyjama King Peter Alexander's summer collection. The garment needed to be a pyjama or lingerie style, with one piece being able to be used as outdoor daywear. The designers had 15 minutes to sketch their designs, $75 to purchase their fabrics and 8 hours to create their look. The winner of the challenge will have their garment commercially produced and sold in selected Peter Alexander stores.
 Guest Judge: Peter Alexander
 Winner: William Lazootin
 Eliminated: Ivana Stipicic

Episode Three
Original Airdate: 22 July 2009

The challenge this episode is to create completely wearable outfits from nothing but materials from a hardware shop. The designers had 15 minutes with $85 to purchase their materials and 13 hours to complete their look. Paula Joy acts as guest judge as the contestants showcase their designs on the runway.

 Guest Judge: Paula Joye
 Winner: Lauren Vieyra
 Eliminated: Claudia Chabo

Episode Four
Original Airdate: 29 July 2009

In this week's challenge, the designers are divided into teams of 3 and each team member must create one outfit (3 outfits per team) inspired by a zoo animal. The designers had 15 minutes with $70 each or $210 for each team to purchase their fabrics and the total of 8 hours to complete their look. The designers Guest judge Arthur Gallan helps Kristy Hinze and the panel decide who will be in and who will be out.

 Guest Judge: Arthur Gallan
 Winning Team: Team Lions
 Winner: Anthony Capon
 Eliminated: Amber Renae & Ryan Whelan

Episode Five
Original Airdate: 5 August 2009

The challenge this episode is to create a three-piece outfit that is modern cutting edge for a complete male stranger. The designers were told to search for a random male client from the street to model for their outfits. The designers had 15 minutes with $100 to purchase their fabrics and approximately 12 hours to complete their look.

 Guest Judge: Alex Zabotto-Bentley
 Winner: William Lazootin
 Eliminated: Kellyanne Russell

Episode Six
Original Airdate: 12 August 2009

The six eliminated designers return to team up with the remaining six designers to create an outfit and head piece for the Spring Carnival. The designers had 10 minutes to sketch their designs, 15 minutes with $100 to purchase their fabrics and a total of 10 hours to complete their look. One designer will be brought back into the competition, and one designer will be out.

 Guest Judge: Leona Edmiston
 Winner: Anthony Capon
 Eliminated: Michael Finch
 Back into The Competition: Ivana Stipicic

Episode Seven
Original Airdate: 19 August 2009

The latest challenge for the designers is to create an innovative outfit using the fresh food and packaging available to them at Melbourne's Victoria Market.
 Guest Judge: Alex Zabotto-Bentley, Bettina Liano
 Winner: Ivana Stipicic
 Eliminated: Yopie Stafurik

Episode Eight
Original Airdate: 26 August 2009

This week's challenge is to work with students from the White House Institute of design to create three ready-to-wear outfits for summer 2010, which will be modeled by other students. They were given 20 minutes to search for 3 students to work for them and 2 minutes to find some of the remaining students to model for their outfits. One of each student of the team were forced to go purchase the fabrics instead of the designer. They were given 20 minutes with $180 to purchase the fabrics. There was only a total of 12 hours to complete the look.
 Guest Judge: Aurelio Costarella
 Winner: Anthony Capon
 Eliminated: Mark Neighbour

Episode Nine
Original Airdate: 2 September 2009

This week's challenge is to design a show-stopping dress that will complete the latest collection by leading Australian evening wear label J'Aton. Each designers were given a massive $500 to purchase their fabrics and a total of 20 hours to complete their overall look. The winner was Lauren Vieyra and her dress was added to the J'aton collection bonus a life internship with J'aton.
 Guest Judge:  Jacob Luppino, Anthony Pittorino
 Winner: Lauren Vieyra
 Eliminated: Ivana Stipicic

Episode Ten
Original Airdate: 9 September 2009

The final three designers leave the Whitehouse and return to their homes with $10,000 each to design and create their own collection and there's one final twist in store that the designers don't see coming!
 There was no elimination on episode 10.

Episode Eleven
Original Airdate: 16 September 2009

It's the final countdown to the runway, and every second counts as the final three cast and fit models for their shows, and race to complete their garments in time.
 Guest Judge: Simon Lock, Paula Joye
 Winner: Anthony Capon
 Eliminated: Lauren Vieyra, William Lazootin

External links 
 Project Runway Australia
 Official Myspace page

References

2009 Australian television seasons
Season 02
2009 in fashion